Joanna Szeszko  (born ) is a retired Polish volleyball player, who played as a universal.

She was part of the Poland women's national volleyball team at the 2002 FIVB Volleyball Women's World Championship in Germany. On club level she played with SKRA Warschau.

Clubs
 SKRA Warschau (2002)

References

1974 births
Living people
Polish women's volleyball players
Place of birth missing (living people)